Beijing Subdistrict is a subdistrict in Xigang District, Dalian, Liaoning province, China. , it has 7 residential communities under its administration.

See also 
 List of township-level divisions of Liaoning

References 

Township-level divisions of Liaoning
Dalian